The First Feminist Congress of Yucatán was a gathering of Mexican feminists that happened in 1916. The delegates gathered at the José Peón Contreras Theater in Mérida, Yucatán, Mexico from January 13 to 16. It was held under the auspices of the Yucatecan government. The Mexican government and historians largely consider it the first of its kind in the country. It was the second to be held in all of Latin America and the Caribbean, the first held in Argentina in 1910.

Social Climate in Yucatán and Mexico 
The Congress occurred during the Mexican Revolution, a period of prominent social change in Mexico. Additionally, the Governor of Yucatán Salvador Alvarado was sympathetic to socialist and feminist causes. Finally, feminist causes had been growing in the country since the turn of the century. Mexican feminists used magazines and newspapers to demand their participation within politics and to express their position vis-à-vis political events.

Yucatecan Society Until Revolution 
Following Independence from Spain, the social and political atmosphere in Yucatán was characterized by enterprise and change. Yucatecan elites who controlled the estancias and haciendas sought to modernize the region into “an economically active and culturally progressive region” by mechanizing agricultural production. Historian Anna Macías argues that elite Yucatecan women began to figure into the spirit of enterprise by 1846, upon establishment of the first public primary school for girls in Mérida.

In 1870 a group of Yucatecan women founded La Siempreviva, a feminist organization, in Mérida. The organization was led by prominent Mexican feminist Rita Cetina Gutiérrez. The organization raised funds for the establishment of a school for girls, La Siempreviva School, which opened on May 3, 1870. Notable alumni include Consuelo Zavala y Castillo and Dominga Canto y Pastrana, who helped in organizing the First Feminist Congress of Yucatán in 1916.

By 1910 Yucatán boasted impressive developments in education. The literacy rate was at 59%, one of the highest in the country. Women played a substantial role in education. 1,132 teachers, of whom 635 were women, taught 34, 968 male and 27, 058 female students.

Historian Anna Macías argues that progress and modernity was achieved at the expense of forced labor of Indigenous Mayans on henequen plantations. Macías notes that, "From 1830 onward, the self-sufficient Maya villages, protected by the Crown before independence, lost ground against the encroaching plantations, 36 and compliant state legislatures passed debt peonage laws that forcibly attached the Maya population to the estates created after independence. By 1910, out of a population of 339,613 there were 76,896 agricultural workers and some 99,058 domestic servants in Yucatán.”

Influence of the Mexican Revolution 
The Mexican Revolution began in 1910, preceding the First Feminist Congress. It continued through the year that it was held. Historians Alejandre Ramírez and Torres Alonso consider the Revolution a "democratic opening" whereby a new social contract was being negotiated between the Mexican and society. Many generals and politicians vied for control of the seat of national power in Mexico City. One of them was Governor of Coahuila Venustiano Carranza, who created a state militia with broad support from Northern Mexico known as the Constitutionalist Army. By 1915, Carranza became de facto President of Mexico. The government of Venustiano Carranza was interested in the contributions of women but was opposed to the idea of women's suffrage.

Influence of Governor Salvador Alvarado 
On February 27, 1915, Carranza named Salvador Alvarado Governor and military commander of Yucatán. The former Governor Toribio V. De los Santos fomented a rebel movement against Alvarado, which he defeated. Alvarado entered Mérida on March 19, 1915.

In office, Alvarado promoted socialist and feminist causes. Before taking the governorship, he acquired an extensive education. In particular, he had knowledge of feminist thought promulgated within nineteenth century European socialist circles. In his book The Reconstruction of Mexico, Volume 1, Alvarado shows an affinity and appreciation for state sponsored socialism. He cites State Socialism by W.E. Walling and H.W. Laidler as an influential work. Alvarado also engaged with nationalist rhetoric common at the time:State socialism: in it lies the formula that gives us the willpower to achieve progress, showing us the examples of young nations that have progressed because they have accepted it with good will and with the most fervent enthusiasm. State socialism: in it lies the formula that we invoke, providing the practical means for its application, in order to group the great Mexican family into one sole project of national aggrandizement: the conquest of our economic independence, as the base of all our liberties; those which tie us to one another, and those which unite us with the rest of the world’s nations.Additionally, he advocated for women's education and their distancing from the influence of the Catholic Church.

The First Feminist Congress 

On October 28, 1915, Governor Alvarado publicized the Congress to the public in an official release (convocatoria) in the local newspaper La Voz de la Revolución (Voice of the Revolution). In it he called on “all the honorable women of Yucatán” to attend. The issues to be discussed revolved around four themes, which were outlined in Article 4 of the convocatoria:IV. This Congress will discuss and resolve the following topics: 1. What social mediums should be used to emancipate women from the yoke of tradition? 2. What role does primary school play in feminine vindication, so that she might prepare herself for life? 3. What are the arts and occupations that the state should foster and whose propensity is to prepare women for a strong life of progress? 4. What are the public functions that women can and should carry out so that she might not only be a direct element but also a leader of society?In the convocatoria, Governor Alvarado announced that the Congress be limited to literate women with a primary education. Mostly Yucatecan women attended the Congress, but a few delegates were from Mexico City. Additionally, it attracted mostly middle-class teachers. Among the participants were Elvia Carrillo Puerto, Beatriz Peniche Barrera and Raquel Dzib Cícero, Yucatán locals who were later elected to the national legislature as its first women deputies.

Preparation, Organization, and Publicity 
In preparation for the Congress, Governor Alvarado held pedagogical congresses ahead of the event. Many delegates of these also attended the Congress.

To help organize the Congress, Alvarado turned to Consuelo Zavala y Castillo, whom he picked to lead the organizing committee. Dominga Canto served as the Vice President of the committee, and the rest of the members were composed of secretaries, a treasurer, committee members, and publicity agents. It held a dozen meetings from November 13, 1915, to January 9, 1916. The committee agreed to: 1) suspend classes so that delegates, mostly teachers, could attend, 2) grant delegates train passes and travel allowances of ten pesos daily, 3) house delegates in the schools in which classes were suspended. Finally, the organizing committee named special committees, composed of five women each, to draw up resolutions on the four themes as delineated in the convocatoria.

The Congress was publicized extensively. The newspaper La Voz de la Revolución acted as a main vehicle through which publicity occurred. Director of the newspaper at the time, Antonio Ancona Albertos had extensive ties to the Alvarado government, eventually becoming interim governor himself. Soto argues that the newspaper became the "semi-official organ of the Constitutionalists, and Alvarado's proclamations and speeches were given full coverage within its pages." Two weeks before the congress, Zavala y Castillo participated in an interview with the newspaper in which she expressed her optimism about the Congress, saying, "Oh yes! I am a grand feminist! ... I believe that modern woman has the right to struggle."

Proceedings and Controversy 
620 participants, of whom 617 were women, convened at the José Peón Contreras Theater in downtown Mérida on the morning of January 13 through 16 to discuss the issues raised by Governor Alvarado. The Congress began with introductory remarks by Alvarado, the playing of a waltz, and the recitation of poetry. After this, election of the president of the Congress occurred. Adolfina Valencia de Ávila won with 340 votes, denying Consuelo Zavala the position. Afterwards the Congress opened for remarks from the delegates.
Soon after, the Congress reached a flashpoint when César González, an education official under President Carranza, read a speech by prominent Mexico-City based feminist Hermila Galindo, who was not in attendance. Galindo's speech "The Woman of the Future" touched on topics such as abortion, sexuality, and prostitution.Needless to say, there exists an overwhelming need for revision of the civil and penal codes, increasing the punishment in cases of seduction and abandonment. When a woman, mesmerized, surrenders herself to her lover, compelled by the ineluctable sexual instinct, the man stands before society as a kind of daredevil: a charming copy of Don Juan Tenorio. The impunity of his crime renders him cynical, and he relates his deed in the mighty tone a Revolutionary Chief would use to tell of taking a town. But the wretched woman who has done no more than comply with one of the demands of her instinct, not denied to dhe lowest of females, is flung into society's scorn: her future cut off, she is tossed into the abyss of despair, misery, madness, or suicide. How often the local news informs us of the wretch who resorted to crime, killing her to hide her "fault"! The crime statistics are replete with infanticide and induced abortions, not counting those which remain hidden: a proof the great grief of public censure in the soul of the poor woman who has erred!Such topics were considered uncommon in public discussion at the time. Responding to Galindo's speech, the delegates divided themselves into three ideological factions.

Ideological Positions of the Delegates 
During the Congress, three ideological factions emerged: 1) the Catholic conservative position, 2) the radical position, and 3) the moderate position. According to Shirlene Ann Soto, the Catholic conservative delegates were concerned with maintaining women in the traditional roles of wife and mother. The teacher Francisca García Ortíz represents this faction, whose speech is emphasized the education of both men and women. The radical position advocated for the total equality of the sexes, as well as universal suffrage. Finally, the moderate position advocated for women's education and approached suffrage more cautiously.

Outcomes 
In the last session of the Congress, the delegates drafted an amendment to the Yucatán Constitution allowing women the right to vote in municipal elections. The proposal was unanimously approved.

The Congress received praise from the international community. On March 13, 1916 Manuel Téllez sent a letter to the chief of the Office of Propaganda of the Revolution with a congratulatory letter from Japan on the holding of the Congress. Additionally, news of the Congress reached the United States. United States feminist Mary Sheepshanks addressed a letter to Governor Alvarado on November 4, 1916.

In an open letter to the public published on May 5, 1916, Governor Salvador Alvarado expressed his sentiments in relation to the Congress:In the First Feminist Congress topics were discussed in relation to the economic, social and political liberation of women; but, possibly, haste and a lack of adequate preparation of the delegates to address said topics, resulted in the prevention of resolutions being taken in a positive manner and some issues that related to radical themes were, consequently, rejected. But protest against the state surged which women today maintain, against the minimal protection that the laws give them, against education, which does not prepare them for the clean fight against existence nor for the home, against the concerns which have eternally tied her to tradition and routine, which have made her not an element of progress and fight but rather of simplicity and resistance, this First Congress has been enough to recognize that the Mexican woman, represented in Yucatán, has finally realized the situation which she maintains...Governor Alvarado convened a Second Feminist Congress, which took place in November 23 to December 2, 1916.

The Congress influenced national policy under the Venustiano Carranza administration. In particular, the Ley de Relaciones Familiares (The Familial Relations Law), which enumerated the legal equality of men and women, absolute divorce and increased women's access to civil service jobs and higher education.

Historians are in agreement that the Congress was a critical event in the burgeoning women's suffrage movement. Women achieved universal suffrage in Mexico in 1953.

See also 

 Feminism in Mexico
 Women in Mexico
 Soldaderas

Bibliography 

 Francisco Macías. “The First Feminist Congress of Mexico.” The Library of Congress. May 6, 2013.
 Aurora Cortina G. Quijano. “Los Congresos Feministas de Yucatán en 1916 y su Influencia en la Legislación Local y Federal." Anuario Mexicano de Historia del Derecho, 10.
 Anna Macías. Against all Odds: The Feminist Movement in Mexico to 1940. Westport, CT: Greenwood Press, 1982.
 Alejandre Ramírez, Gloria Luz and Eduardo Torres Alonso. “El Primer Congreso Feminista de Yucatán 1916. El camino a la legislación del sufragio y reconocimiento de ciudadanía a las mujeres. Construcción y tropiezos.” Estudios Políticos 9, no. 39 (2016): 59–89.
 Memoria Política de México. “1916 Primer Congreso Feminista convocado por Salvador Alvarado.” Accessed 19 April 2022.
 Alaíde Foppa and Helene F. de Aguilar. “The First Feminist Congress in Mexico, 1916.” Signs 5, no. 1 (1979): 192–99.
 Emma Pérez. The Decolonial Imaginary: Writing Chicanas into History. Bloomington: Indiana University Press, 1999.
 Museo de la Mujer en Argentina. “Primer Congreso Femenino Internacional.” Accessed 19 April 2022.
 Secretaría de Relaciones Exteriores. “Cien años del Primer Congreso Feminista en México.” January 15, 2016. Accessed 21 April 2022.
 Salvador Alvarado. La Reconstrucción de México, Tomo 1: Un Mensaje a los Pueblos de América. Mexico City: Instituto Nacional de Estudios Históricos de las Revoluciones de México, 2020.
 Shirlene Anne Soto. Emergence of the Modern Mexican Woman: Her Participation in Revolution and Struggle for Equality, 1910-1940. Denver: Arden Press, Inc., 1990.

References 

Wikipedia Student Program
History of Mexico
Women in Mexico
Women's suffrage in Mexico
Yucatán